Eglwys Sant Ioan, or Church of St John, is an Anglican church in the town of Carmarthen, Carmarthenshire, Wales. It was built in 1889–1890 as the Welsh language church for the parish of St Peter. It is located in Penuel Street.

The architects for the building of Eglwys Sant Ioan were Middleton, Prothero & Phillot of Cheltenham. A. G. Edwards, Bishop of St. Asaph and former vicar of St Peter's, Carmarthen, laid the foundation stone on 25 June 1889 and Thomas Collins of Tewkesbury undertook the building work. The original estimate was for a total amount of around £2000 but the costs overran, and the final sum spent was £3041. The building was opened on 15 June 1890 by the Bishop of St. Davids.

The church was designated as a Grade II listed building on 19 May 1981, being "a well-designed late Victorian smaller town church".

References

Carmarthen, Eglwys Sant Ioan
Churches in Carmarthen